Austin William Connelly (born September 18, 1996) is a professional golfer who plays on the European Tour. He holds dual citizenship in Canada and the United States.

Amateur career
Connelly was born in Irving, Texas, to an American mother and Canadian father. Connelly won the 2014 FJ Invitational by six strokes, and he won the Jones Cup Invitational the following year. He played two 2015 PGA Tour events as an amateur, the AT&T Byron Nelson Championship and RBC Canadian Open, and made the cut in both. After committing to Southern Methodist University, and later the University of Arkansas, Connelly instead turned professional in August 2015.

Professional career
In 2015, Connelly played three events on PGA Tour Canada, making two cuts. The next season, he had four top-10 finishes and placed seventh on the tour's Order of Merit. He earned conditional status for the 2017 European Tour season via its qualifying school and had a pair of top-10 results at the ISPS Handa World Super 6 Perth and the Nordea Masters.

Connelly qualified for the 2017 Open Championship through Final Qualifying at Royal Cinque Ports. Connelly won a four-man playoff for one remaining place.  Being tied for third after the third round shooting 67-72-66 (-5), he finished the tournament in a tie for 14th place. In September 2017 he had his best finish on the European Tour, finishing runner-up in the KLM Open.

At the 2019 Pan American Games, Connelly teamed with amateurs Joey Savoie, Mary Parsons, and Brigitte Thibault, to win the bronze medal in the mixed team event.

Amateur wins
2011 Hilton Head Junior, Junior All Star at Penn State
2013 Under Armour/Hunter Mahan Championship
2014 FJ Invitational, Copa Juan Carlos Tailhade
2015 Jones Cup Invitational

Source:

Results in major championships

 

CUT = missed the half-way cut
"T" indicates a tie for a place

Team appearances
Amateur
Junior Ryder Cup (representing the United States): 2014 (winners)
Pan American Games (representing Canada): 2015, 2019

Professional
Aruba Cup (representing PGA Tour Canada): 2016

References

External links

American male golfers
Canadian male golfers
European Tour golfers
Pan American Games medalists in golf
Pan American Games bronze medalists for Canada
Golfers at the 2015 Pan American Games
Golfers at the 2019 Pan American Games
Medalists at the 2019 Pan American Games
Golfers from Texas
People from Irving, Texas
1996 births
Living people